Michel Thépénier (born 6 January 1945) is a French speed skater. He competed in three events at the 1968 Winter Olympics.

References

1945 births
Living people
French male speed skaters
Olympic speed skaters of France
Speed skaters at the 1968 Winter Olympics
Sportspeople from Drôme